The pin-tailed whydah (Vidua macroura) is a small songbird with a conspicuous pennant-like tail in breeding males. It is a resident breeding bird in most of Africa south of the Sahara Desert.

Taxonomy
The pin-tailed whydah was first described by the German naturalist Peter Simon Pallas in 1764 and given the binomial name Fringilla macroura.

Description

The pin-tailed whydah is 12–13 cm in length, although the breeding male's tail adds another 20 cm to this. The adult male has a black back and crown, and a very long black tail. The wings are dark brown with white patches, and the underparts and the head, apart from the crown, are white.  The bill is bright red. The female and non-breeding male have streaked brown upperparts, whitish underparts with buff flanks, and a buff and black face pattern. They lack the long tail extension, but retain the red bill. Immature birds are like the female but plainer and with a greyish bill.

Distribution and habitat
The pin-tailed whydah occurs in much of sub-Saharan Africa, favouring grassland, scrubs and savannah, also coming into parks and gardens. In Portugal it is established in the region around Aveiro, with observations occurring north and south of it. It has also been introduced to southern California, Puerto Rico, and Singapore.

Ecology

The species is a brood parasite which lays its eggs in the nests of estrildid finches, especially waxbills. Unlike the common cuckoo, it does not destroy the host's eggs. Typically, 2–4 eggs are added to those already present. The eggs of both the host and the whydah are white, although the whydah's are slightly larger. The nestling whydahs mimic the gape pattern of the fledglings of the host species.

The male pin-tailed whydah is territorial, and one male often has several females in his small group. He has an elaborate courtship flight display, which includes hovering over the female to display his tail. The song is given from a high perch, and consists of rapid squeaking and churring. The diet of this species consists of seeds and grain.

Gallery

References

Further reading
Pin-tailed whydah – Species text in The Atlas of Southern African Birds.

External links

pin-tailed whydah
Birds of Sub-Saharan Africa
Birds of the Gulf of Guinea
pin-tailed whydah
Taxa named by Peter Simon Pallas